Oryctes gnu, commonly known as Malaysian rhinoceros beetle, is a species of dung beetle native to South Asian and South East Asian countries including: India, Pakistan, Sri Lanka, Philippines, Thailand, Philippines, and Vietnam. It is also introduced to many parts of the world.

This large species has an average length of about 45 to 49 mm. Very similar to much smaller species Oryctes rhinoceros. Adults are dark brown to black in color with shiny dorsum. Head with a prominent horn in male. Male has longer horn than the female. It has three tubercles on thoracic ridge.

References 

Dynastinae
Insects of India
Beetles of Sri Lanka
Beetles described in 1874